Cathryn Rose "Casey" Wilson (born October 24, 1980) is an American actress, comedian, screenwriter, director, and podcaster. Originally known for her performances with the Upright Citizens Brigade comedy troupe in New York, Wilson's first major television appearances came during her two-season stint as a cast member on the NBC sketch comedy series Saturday Night Live from 2008 to 2009. Following SNL, she starred as Penny Hartz in the ABC comedy series Happy Endings for which she was twice nominated to the Critics' Choice Television Award for Best Supporting Actress in a Comedy Series, and has since starred in comedies such as Showtime's Black Monday, Apple TV's The Shrink Next Door, Hulu's The Hotwives and Marry Me on NBC.

Other notable work includes supporting roles in films such as Gone Girl, Julie & Julia, and The Meddler, recurring in the HBO series Mrs. Fletcher, the Amazon comedy One Mississippi, and the Netflix series Atypical, and her 2013 Sundance film Ass Backwards, which she co-wrote and starred in with her creative partner June Diane Raphael. Wilson co-hosts (alongside Danielle Schneider) the Earwolf podcast Bitch Sesh.

Early life and background
Casey Wilson was born and raised in Alexandria, Virginia. She graduated from T. C. Williams High School in 1998 and studied theater at New York University's Tisch School of the Arts and at the Stella Adler Studio of Acting, where she was a recipient of NYU's "Excellence in Acting" award when graduating in 2002.

She is of Irish and Italian heritage, and was raised Baptist. Her parents worked in politics, and she credits her politically opposed parents (her mother was a Democrat, her father a Republican) in shaping her sense of humor, having grown up in a "blue-state/red-state, forever-clashing political household", as she called it in an interview with Washington Flyer. She also has a younger brother, Fletcher.

Her father, Paul O. Wilson, is a political strategist and consultant who runs campaigns for Republican party candidates. Her mother, Kathy Higdon, was a women's rights advocate and served as the chairwoman of the National Women's Political Caucus (NWPC) throughout the 1980s. Under Higdon's leadership, the NWPC endorsed Walter Mondale in the 1984 presidential election.

Kathy Higdon Wilson retired from politics in the late 1980s; switching to a career in early childhood education, she began serving as the director of childcare and development centers in Alexandria, Virginia in 1991. She died of heart failure at age 54 in Rehoboth Beach, Delaware on September 1, 2005. Casey Wilson and her family have since continued to run the Kathy Wilson Foundation, a charitable organization honoring her mother's work in helping children with disabilities.

Wilson's passion for performing began at an early age, and she has said that her first memorable exposure to theater came when her father took her to New York City to see a production of Cats, inspiring her to create her own plays.

When Wilson was nine years old, her father built her a homemade stage in the family's backyard, where she put on plays with other children from the neighborhood. From there, she started taking singing and acting lessons as a teenager. She became involved in her high school's theater program, starring in (and occasionally directing) many of the school's plays and musicals, including a production of The Sound of Music, in which she played the lead role of Maria.

While studying acting at the Stella Adler School of Dramatic Arts, Wilson originally set out to be a dramatic actress, but later started to focus on comedy at the suggestion of an acting teacher.

After graduating from NYU in 2002, Wilson and her best friend from college, June Diane Raphael, began studying improvisational comedy at the Upright Citizens Brigade Theater in New York City, where they eventually ran their two-woman sketch show for a number of years. Performing the long-running stage show opened doors for them as writers. After performing the show at the U.S. Comedy Arts Festival in 2005, they were hired by New Regency Pictures to write the film Bride Wars and landed a development deal with UPN to create a sitcom pilot.

Wilson has cited her biggest influences as Catherine O'Hara, Diane Keaton, Madeline Kahn, Lucille Ball, Bette Davis, Molly Shannon, Cheri Oteri, Debra Winger, and Shirley MacLaine.

Career
Wilson started her comedy career writing and performing with the Upright Citizens Brigade Theatre (UCB) in New York and later in Los Angeles. At UCB, she was a member of the Harold improv teams "Mr. and Mrs. All-Star", "Sentimental Lady", and "Hey, Uncle Gary!".

Among her best-known work at UCB was the long-running two-woman sketch show Rode Hard and Put Away Wet, written and performed alongside her comedy partner and best friend June Diane Raphael; the show ran from 2003 to 2006 in New York and Los Angeles and was an official selection at 2005's US Comedy Arts Festival in Aspen, Colorado. The two women, who first met in a clowning class during their freshman year at NYU, went on to win the ECNY Award for "Best Comedy Duo" in 2005.

Wilson and Raphael's comedic partnership has since branched out into an active writing career in film and television. They co-wrote their first screenplay for the comedy Bride Wars, in which they also played supporting roles. They landed a development deal with UPN in 2005 to create a half-hour comedy pilot. In 2007 they worked as writers and story editors on the Americanized version of Creature Comforts on CBS.

Wilson made her film acting debut as an acting student in the final scene of the 2006 Christopher Guest film For Your Consideration. She has since appeared in Julie & Julia, C.O.G., The Breakup Girl, The Guilt Trip, Killers, The Brothers Solomon, Freak Dance, The Great Buck Howard, and the Bob Odenkirk-directed short film Derek & Simon: A Bee and a Cigarette. She also co-starred in the David Fincher thriller Gone Girl (2014), the 2016 dramedy The Meddler, with Susan Sarandon, and the 2019 comedy Always Be My Maybe.

Wilson is a frequent contributor to the popular humor website Funny or Die, writing and starring in many viral videos for the site, including a series of political parodies where she plays Callista Gingrich.

Wilson continues to collaborate with writing partner June Diane Raphael on scripts for film and television. They have worked on numerous script rewrites for films in development, such as projects with Anna Faris and America Ferrera attached to star. As writer-performers, Wilson and Raphael also continue to generate material for themselves. They wrote and starred together in the comedy Ass Backwards, which co-stars Alicia Silverstone, Jon Cryer, Vincent D'Onofrio, Paul Scheer, and Bob Odenkirk. The film premiered at the Sundance Film Festival on January 21, 2013. Wilson and Raphael are working on a second film to star in together, produced by Will Ferrell and Adam McKay's company Gary Sanchez Productions.

Wilson's theater and stage work includes joining the 2010 rotating cast of the Off-Broadway play Love, Loss, and What I Wore (written by Nora Ephron and Delia Ephron) at Manhattan's Westside Theatre. She also contributed short stories to the 2010 book Worst Laid Plans, based on the long-running stage show, in which she co-starred. Wilson and June Diane Raphael created their newest comedic stage show The Realest Real Housewives, which they star in alongside Jessica St. Clair, Melissa Rauch, Danielle Schneider and Morgan Walsh. The show began running at the Upright Citizens Brigade Theatre in 2011.

From April 2011 to May 2013, Wilson starred as Penny Hartz in the ABC ensemble comedy series Happy Endings alongside Eliza Coupe, Elisha Cuthbert, Zachary Knighton, Adam Pally and Damon Wayans, Jr. A breakout role for Wilson, she was nominated twice for "Best Supporting Actress in a Comedy Series" at the Critics' Choice Television Awards for her work on seasons two and three of Happy Endings.  In July 2020, the cast reunited over Zoom for the pandemic-themed episode And the Pandemmy goes to... to raise money for the charities Color of Change and World Central Kitchen.

Wilson again collaborated with her husband David Caspe (they met working together on Happy Endings, which Caspe created) on the NBC sitcom Marry Me, which aired for one season from 2014 to 2015. The series starred Wilson and Ken Marino as an engaged couple, and the premise was loosely based on Wilson and Caspe's relationship. She also starred for two seasons on the Hulu original series The Hotwives. The series is a parody of the reality television franchise The Real Housewives on Bravo. With season one (The Hotwives of Orlando) focused on Orlando, and season two taking place in Las Vegas (The Hotwives of Las Vegas), both seasons featured the same cast playing different roles in each season.

Wilson's other television credits include guest appearances on Black-ish, How I Met Your Mother, The Mindy Project, Drunk History, Grey's Anatomy, Fresh Off the Boat, Kroll Show, Bored to Death, Comedy Bang! Bang!, The Middle, and The League; she has also had voiceover roles in the animated comedy programs American Dad!, Animals., Archibald's Next Big Thing, Family Guy, Glenn Martin, DDS, and The Life & Times of Tim, as well as in Littlest Pet Shop, where she starred in the series finale episode as Felina Meow. She plays a recurring role in the Amazon series One Mississippi starring Tig Notaro, as Tig's ex-girlfriend Brooke. In 2017, Wilson co-starred opposite Busy Philipps in Tina Fey's unaired comedy pilot The Sackett Sisters for NBC. In 2019, she began a recurring role as Tiffany Georgina on the Showtime comedy Black Monday and played Jane Rosen in the HBO mini-series Mrs. Fletcher.

In 2019, Wilson wrote and directed the short film Daddio starring Michael McKean, which premiered at the Toronto International Film Festival on September 6, 2019.

In 2021, Wilson starred alongside Will Ferrell, Paul Rudd, and Kathryn Hahn in the Apple TV+ mini-series The Shrink Next Door, based on the popular Wondery podcast of the same name. In addition, her book of humorous essays, The Wreckage of My Presence was published on May 4, 2021 by HarperCollins and made the New York Times  bestseller list for non-fiction works.

Saturday Night Live

After auditioning in late 2007, Wilson was hired in January 2008 to join the cast of Saturday Night Live, succeeding departing cast member Maya Rudolph. However, due to the 2007–2008 Writers Guild of America strike, she did not make her first appearance as a cast member until the show returned in February 2008; she was the first new addition to the cast in over two years, and was also the first SNL cast member to have been born in the 1980s. Wilson's most memorable work on SNL included celebrity impressions of, among others, Rachael Ray, Elizabeth Dole, Elizabeth Taylor, Ginnifer Goodwin, Katy Perry, and Jennifer Aniston, as well as original characters such as Dusty Velvet, "the paralyzed stripper"; and Toni Ward, co-host of "The Cougar Den". After spending two seasons on SNL, Wilson was let go from the show before the start of the 2009–2010 season. When asked how she felt about her SNL departure in an October 2009 interview, Wilson said: "My mindset is good. I did it for a year and a half. I don't think it will ultimately define my career. And it wasn't the best fit for me."

Notable characters on SNL
Wilson has performed as a number of notable characters on Saturday Night Live:

 Dusty Velvet, a strip club dancer who was left paralyzed from the neck down following a freak Tilt-A-Whirl accident, and refuses to let it stop her from performing her act. She is only able to perform her "erotic moves" with the assistance of Donnie (played by Ashton Kutcher) the strip club manager.
 Nora Maharelle, part of the singing sisterly quartet The Maharelle Sisters who are regularly featured on The Lawrence Welk Show. Their otherwise flawless performances are always ruined by the fourth sister, Dooneese (played by Kristen Wiig), because of her off-key singing and freakish appearance.
 Toni Ward, one of the cougars who co-hosts The Cougar Den. She is distinguished by her deep voice and offbeat methods for pursuing younger men. For example, she says that for Valentine's Day: "I'm going to suck down some Jello shooters and wander around USC's campus wearing a T-shirt that says: 'I'll pay you and this won't get messy.'

Podcasting
On December 2, 2015, Wilson and comedian Danielle Schneider began hosting the Earwolf podcast Bitch Sesh, where they and a guest have comedic discussions about the previous night's episode of The Real Housewives, as well as other topics related to the Bravo channel and reality television. Guests have included June Diane Raphael, Andy Cohen, Adam Pally, Jerry O'Connell, Matt Besser, Vanessa Bayer, Michael Rapaport, Elisha Cuthbert, Kristen Wiig, Michelle Collins, and Retta. Paul Scheer first announced the show on his podcast How Did This Get Made? and released a special preview episode, describing it as a "sister podcast" to his show, with a focus on discussing reality television instead of movies. Entertainment websites including Vulture, Entertainment Weekly and The A.V. Club ranked Bitch Sesh on numerous podcast "Best Of" lists. In 2022, she hosted the Wondery podcast Fed Up about the F-Factor diet.

Personal life
Wilson lives in Los Angeles and is married to comedy writer David Caspe. They originally met in early 2010 when she auditioned for his ABC series Happy Endings. After working together on the show for over a year, they started dating in July 2011. They got engaged over Labor Day weekend in September 2013 and were married on May 25, 2014 in Ojai, California. They have two sons, Max Red Caspe (born May 2015) and Henry Bear Caspe (born August 24, 2017). When her son Max was four years old, he was diagnosed with celiac disease, an immune disorder affecting the small intestine. Casey welcomed daughter Frances 'Frankie' Rose Caspe via surrogate in January 2023.

Wilson shares her family's interest in politics. She was a supporter of Hillary Clinton during the 2008 presidential election and volunteered on her campaign. She went on the road with the Clintons in the Midwest, speaking at and introducing Hillary and Bill Clinton at campaign rallies in Iowa and Indiana.

Wilson and her family maintain the charitable Kathy Wilson Foundation, established in 2005, which focuses on children with disabilities. The foundation screens three- and four-year-olds in the Alexandria community for disabilities. Her father Paul Wilson serves as president, with Wilson and her brother Fletcher serving as vice presidents. The foundation distributes donations and grants to local area preschools and childcare centers in Virginia every year.

Filmography

Film

Television

Discography

Podcast

Awards and nominations

References

External links

Casey Wilson on FunnyOrDie 

1980 births
Living people
21st-century American actresses
American film actresses
American podcasters
American screenwriters
American stage actresses
American television actresses
American television writers
American voice actresses
American women comedians
American people of Irish descent
American people of Italian descent
Actresses from Alexandria, Virginia
Tisch School of the Arts alumni
American women screenwriters
American women television writers
American impressionists (entertainers)
American sketch comedians
Upright Citizens Brigade Theater performers
21st-century American comedians
American women podcasters